Eva Martincová and Elena Wagner were the defending champions, but Wagner did not compete this year. Martincová teamed up with Émilie Loit and lost in first round to Meike Babel and Laurence Courtois.

Giulia Casoni and Iroda Tulyaganova won the title by defeating Catherine Barclay and Eva Dyrberg 2–6, 6–4, 6–4 in the final.

Seeds

Draw

Draw

References

 Official results archive (ITF)
 Official results archive (WTA)

WTA Knokke-Heist
2000 WTA Tour